The Tivoli Theatre was a major performing arts venue in Melbourne's East End Theatre District, located at 249 Bourke Street. The theatre's origins dated from 1866, with various remodelling and rebuilding throughout its history. Its final building opened as the New Opera House in 1901, and was renamed the Tivoli in 1914 when it joined the Tivoli circuit. The Tivoli eventually closed in 1966.

Early years
In the years following the Victorian gold rush, Melbourne's population and affluence was thriving, and entertainment venues were regularly established. One such venue was the Australia Hall, a small variety theatre build above livery stables. The Australia Hall opened on 2 November 1866, and was described as "of the exceedingly unpicturesque order of architecture." It was eventually redecorated and rechristened several times, before burning down in 1869.

Three years later, in 1872, a new theatre was erected on the site by tramway pioneer Henry Hoyt and George H. Johnson. Opening on 24 August, the Prince of Wales Opera House was a large, four level auditorium seating 2500 patrons. Its first lessee was opera impresario William Saurin Lyster.

Harry Rickards
In 1895, British actor-manager Harry Rickards took over the lease of the Opera House and made it the Melbourne headquarters of his growing business. Rickards presented a range of music hall/vaudeville entertainment for the city's increasingly affluent middle class by importing international talent, including Charles Godfrey Leland, Ada Reeve, Marie Lloyd and W. C. Fields.

New Opera House

At the turn of the century, safety concerns forced the closure and eventual demolition of the Opera House. Rickards commissioned the Melbourne architect William Pitt to design a replacement theatre, and the New Opera House opened in May 1901, during the celebrations of the first Parliament of the new Federation of Australia. Rickards' Tivoli circuit now included venues in Sydney, Brisbane, Perth, and Adelaide, and became one of the world's most respected, lucrative, and powerful vaudeville touring enterprises.

Rickards died in London on 13 October 1911, and the New Opera House, as well as the Tivoli business, was sold to boxing entrepreneur Hugh D. McIntosh. In 1914, in line with the other venues on the national circuit, the New Opera House was renamed the Tivoli.

Tivoli, the home of variety
For the next half-century, the Tivoli was Melbourne's home of variety, presenting both local and international performers, including Winifred Atwell, Sophie Tucker, Tommy Trinder, Nelson Eddy, and Tommy Steele.

During the 1950s and early 60s there were also various pantomime matinees in the summer holidays, featuring puppets, acrobats and comic performers such as John Bluthal, Johnny Lockwood, Barbara Angell and Max Reddy (often as the Dame).

The introduction of television to Melbourne with the opening night of Channel 7 included a 45-minute variety program relayed from the Tivoli stage featuring Barry Humphries.

Closure
After regular TV programing started in late 1956, audience numbers at cinemas and theatres began to dwindle. The Tivoli circuit was hit especially hard, as many of its most popular variety performance acts, singers and comedians, such as Syd Heylen, Joff Ellen and Buster Fiddess, had abandoned live theatre and nightclub engagements to concentrate on the new medium.

In March 1966 the Jimmy Edwards touring show brought the era of live variety to an end. The Tivoli Theatre Melbourne closed on the evening of 2 April 1966, with the proceedings telecast nationally.

"I don't relish the distinction of being the man who closed the Tiv. Music hall's dead in Britain. Now this one's dead, there's nowhere to go. I'll either become a character comedian or a pauper." — Jimmy Edwards final curtain-closing speech, 2 April 1966

The theatre survived as a cinema for another few months, before being gutted by fire. The building was demolished to make way for new offices,  shops, and an arcade which in the late 60s hosted Hippie and counterculture stalls for a time.

Legacy
The legacy of the Tivoli continues through a generation of performers who 'cut their teeth' on the Tivoli stage; and through Melbourne's theatre restaurants which were borne from the Tivoli tradition. Tivoli-style performances continued for a time at the Lido nightclub, and at Tikki and John's.

References

Former theatres in Melbourne
Demolished buildings and structures in Melbourne
Opera houses in Australia